The 2018–19 Copa Federación de España was the 26th edition of the Copa Federación de España, also known as Copa RFEF, a knockout competition for Spanish football clubs in Segunda División B and Tercera División.

Mirandés won the trophy, a cash prize of €90,152 and the qualification for the next year tournament. The runner-up received a cash prize of €30,051 and every semifinalist €12,020. Additionally, each winner of autonomous community tournament  received €3,005.

The competition began in late July 2018 with the first games of the Regional stages and ended on 28 March 2019 with the national final.

Regional tournaments

West Andalusia and Ceuta tournament
Betis Deportivo was the only registered team and qualified directly for national phase.

East Andalusia and Melilla tournament
Huétor Tájar was the only registered team and qualified directly for national phase.

Aragon tournament
For the 2018–19 edition, eight teams joined the tournament.

Group 1

Group 2

Final

Asturias tournament
The twelve qualified teams will be divided into four groups of three teams, where the winners will qualify for the semifinals. Teams will be drawn according to their league positions in the previous season.

Group 1

Group 2

Group 3

Group 4

Knockout stage

Final

Balearic Islands tournament
The draw was made 5 July.

Final

Basque Country tournament
Tournament will be played in two stages, the first with two groups, one of three teams and the other with two. Winners will play the final over two matches. The group stage phase was drawn on 6 September by Basque Football Federation.

Group 1

Group 2

Final

Canary Islands tournament
Tenerife B was the only registered team and qualified directly for national phase.

Cantabria tournament
Teams qualified between second and ninth place in 2017–18 Tercera División Group 3 registered for playing the competition. The bracket was drawn on 11 July. Quarter-finals and Semi-finals will be played in Cabezón de la Sal.

Final

Castile-La Mancha tournament
The Castile-La Mancha Football Federation announced the XVII Torneo Junta de Comunidades de Castilla La Mancha as the regional Copa RFEF qualifying tournament.

Final

Castile and León tournament
The competition will be played in a group stage between three teams, all of them from the province of Burgos. The group was drawn on 4 September 2018.

Catalonia tournament
Llagostera was the only registered team and qualified directly for national phase.

Extremadura tournament
17 teams joined the tournament, consisting in a single-game knockout tournament. The preliminary round and the round of 16 were firstly drawn, and later each round was drawn independently.

Final

Galicia tournament
Twelve teams registered for playing the competition. The bracket was drawn on 6 July.

Final

La Rioja tournament
The competition was drawn on 30 July.

Final

Madrid tournament
The competition will be played in a group stage between three teams.

Murcia tournament
The competition was drawn on 24 August 2018.

Final

Navarre tournament
The competition will be played in a group stage between three teams. The group was drawn on 8 August 2018.

Valencian Community tournament
The competition will be played in three rounds in two leg ties.

Final

National tournament
The national tournament will begin in November 2018.

Qualified teams

Defending champion
 Pontevedra (3)

Teams losing Copa del Rey first round
 Barakaldo (3)
 Ceuta (4)
 Conquense (3)
 Cornellà (3)
 Cultural Durango (3)
 Don Benito (3)
 Gimnástica Torrelavega (3)
 Internacional (3)
 Langreo (3)
 Marbella (3)
 Mensajero (4)
 Mirandés (3)
 Navalcarnero (3)
 Poblense (4)
 Rápido de Bouzas (3)
 Talavera de la Reina (3)
 Teruel (3)
 Yeclano (4)

Winners of Autonomous Communities tournaments
 Alcobendas Sport (4)
 Arandina (4)
 Bergantiños (4)
 Betis Deportivo (4)
 Cacereño (4)
 Cartagena B (4)
 Ejea (3)
 Huétor Tájar (4)
 Lealtad (4)
 Llagostera (4)
 Peña Deportiva (4)
 Peña Sport (4)
 Real Unión (3)
 Roda (4)
 Socuéllamos (4)
 Tenerife B (4)
 Tropezón (4)
 Varea (4)

(3) Team playing in 2018–19 Segunda División B (third tier)
(4) Team playing in 2018–19 Tercera División (fourth tier)
Slashed teams withdrew from the competition.
Team in bold won the competition.

Preliminary round
The draw for the preliminary round and round of 32 was hold on 26 October 2018. The matches were played between 31 October and 7 November 2018.

|}

First leg

Second leg

Round of 32
The draw for the preliminary round and Round of 32 took place on 26 October 2018. The matches will be played between 15 November and 6 December 2018. 

|}

First leg

Second leg

Round of 16
The draw for the Round of 16 took place on 13 December 2018. Matches were played between 9 and 24 January 2019. 

|}

First leg

Second leg

Quarter-finals
The draw for the Quarter-finals took place on 25 January 2019. Matches were played between 6 and 13 February 2019.

|}

First leg

Second leg

Semi-finals
The draw for the Semi-finals and Final took place on 15 February 2019. Matches were played between 27 February and 6 March 2019.

|}

First leg

Second leg

Final
Matches were played between 20 and 28 March 2019.

|}

First leg

Second leg

References

External links
Royal Spanish Football Federation 

2018-19
3
2018–19 Segunda División B
2018–19 Tercera División